Huxley may refer to:

People
 Huxley (surname)
 The British Huxley family
 Thomas Henry Huxley (1825–1895), British biologist known as "Darwin's Bulldog"
 Aldous Huxley (1894–1963), British writer, author of Brave New World, grandson of Thomas Huxley
 Julian Huxley (1887–1975), British biologist, brother of Aldous Huxley
 Andrew Huxley (1917–2012), British biologist, brother of Aldous Huxley
 Anthony Huxley (1920–1992), British botanist, son of Julian Huxley
 Francis Huxley (1923–2016), British botanist, anthropologist and author, son of Julian Huxley

Geography
 Huxley, Alberta, Canada
 Huxley, Cheshire, England
 Huxley, Iowa, United States
 Huxley, Texas, United States
 Huxley River, New Zealand
 Mount Huxley (disambiguation)

Education
 Huxley College of the Environment, a college of Western Washington University

Other
 Huxley (lunar crater)
 Huxley (Martian crater)
 Huxley (video game), an MMOFPS by Webzen Games Inc.
 Huxley Pig, an animated television series
 Huxley, the third generation of 3D printers from the RepRap Project
 Huxley, the main antagonist in The Adventures of Elmo in Grouchland

See also
 Huxley Stakes, a horse race run at Chester, England